Silvio Orlando (born 30 June 1957) is an Italian actor.

Orlando was born and raised in Naples, where he started acting in theatre in 1976. He made his film debut in 1988 with a supporting role in the comedy Kamikazen: Last Night in Milan, directed by Gabriele Salvatores. Since then, he has collaborated multiple times with Salvatores, as well as more prominently with other Italian directors such as Nanni Moretti, Daniele Luchetti, and Carlo Mazzacurati.

During his career, Orlando has been nominated seven times to the David di Donatello Award for Best Actor, winning it in 2006 for his role in Moretti's The Caiman. In 2008 he won the Volpi Cup for Best Actor at the Venice Film Festival for his role in Giovanna's Father. Outside Italy, he is best known as scheming Cardinal Voiello in the internationally co-produced TV series The Young Pope(2016) and its sequel The New Pope(2020), both created by Paolo Sorrentino.
 
On stage, Orlando most notably directed in 1988 two plays by Peppino De Filippo, Don Rafelo 'o trombone and Cupido scherza e spazza, while in 2008 he acted in Roberto Paci Dalò's L'assedio delle ceneri. His nephew  is also an actor and playwright.

Filmography

Film

Television

References

External links

1957 births
Living people
Male actors from Naples
David di Donatello winners
Nastro d'Argento winners
Ciak d'oro winners
Volpi Cup for Best Actor winners